Endotricha propinqua is a species of snout moth in the genus Endotricha. It was described by Paul Ernest Sutton Whalley in 1963, and is known from New Hebrides, the Loyalty Islands, and New Caledonia.

References

Moths described in 1963
Endotrichini